It's All in Your Mind is a 1938 American drama film directed by Bernard B. Ray and starring Byron Foulger, Constance Bergen and Lynton Brent.

It was released as an exploitation movie outside the usual mainstream channels, and it played theaters catering to moviegoers seeking sensationalized fare. Byron Foulger, then an obscure supporting actor playing bit parts, played the leading role of a henpecked husband who resolves to sample the fast life of nightclubs and good-time girls. He does, but he's haunted by visions of the seamy side of life (allowing writer-producer-director Bernard B. Ray to include semi-nudity and suggestive situations). It's All in Your Mind was re-released in later years as Fools of Desire, the title hinting at the spicy content.

Foulger was so convincing as the milquetoast that other studios began casting him regularly, and he was typecast as mild-mannered worrywarts for the next 30 years.

Cast
 Byron Foulger as Wilbur Crane  
 Constance Bergen as Dorothy  
 Lynton Brent as Danny 
 Betty Roadman as Martha Crane

References

Bibliography
 McCarty, Clifford. Film Composers in America: A Filmography, 1911-1970. Oxford University Press, 2000.

External links
 

1938 films
1938 drama films
American drama films
Films directed by Bernard B. Ray
American black-and-white films
1930s English-language films
1930s American films